The Bez (or Bès) is a right tributary to the river Midouze in the Landes, in the Southwest of France. Its name is similar to that of Baïse. The Bez has its origins in the northern Morcenx where it collects the waters of Brassenx. It joins the Midouze in Saint-Yaguen.

References

Rivers of France
Rivers of Landes (department)
Rivers of Nouvelle-Aquitaine